Tommy Cash (born April 5, 1940) is an American musician, singer, and songwriter. His elder brother was Johnny Cash.

Biography
Cash was born in Dyess, Arkansas, United States, the youngest of four sons and three daughters of Ray and Carrie (Rivers) Cash (one of whom was Johnny Cash, born eight years earlier). He formed his first band in high school. After high-school graduation, he enlisted in the U.S. Army, and worked as a DJ for the Armed Forces Radio network.

After the Army, Cash played with Hank Williams Jr., and eventually gained a record deal from Musicor Records in 1965. A year later, he joined United Artists Records and just missed the Country Top 40 in 1968 with "The Sounds of Goodbye."

In late 1969, while on Epic Records, he delivered his biggest hit, a tune dedicated to John F. Kennedy, Robert F. Kennedy, and Martin Luther King Jr., entitled "Six White Horses". In 1970, he had a pair of top-10 singles, "One Song Away" and "Rise and Shine", written by Carl Perkins. Cash's final top-20 hit, "I Recall a Gypsy Woman", was released in 1973.

Cash continues to perform concerts around the world. He also acted in the 2016 film The River Thief.

Other interests
Cash is a licensed realtor in Tennessee, and an agent with Crye-Leike Real Estate Services in Nashville. He was listing agent for the sale of Johnny Cash and June Carter Cash's home in Hendersonville, Tennessee, after they both died in 2003.

Discography

Albums

Singles

A"Six White Horses" peaked at No. 79 on the Billboard Hot 100 and No. 72 on the RPM Top Singles chart in Canada.

References

External links
 Official website
 

1940 births
Living people
American male singer-songwriters
American country singer-songwriters
American people of English descent
American people of Scottish descent
Country musicians from Arkansas
Cash–Carter family
People from Mississippi County, Arkansas
United Artists Records artists
Monument Records artists
Elektra Records artists
Epic Records artists
United States Army soldiers
Singer-songwriters from Arkansas
American male film actors